Peter J. Rachleff is Co-Executive Director of the East Side Freedom Library, and a retired professor of history at Macalester College in the St. Paul, Minnesota specializing in United States labor, immigration and African American history. Rachleff received his B.A. in Sociology at Amherst College in 1973 and M.A. and Ph.D. in history at the University of Pittsburgh in 1981. At Pittsburgh, he studied under  foremost labor-historian David Montgomery. He is the author of internationally recognized academic monographs, and contributor to The Nation, International Socialist Review, Dissent, Z Magazine, and Dollars and Sense, among other publications.

References

External links
Page at the Macalester History Department
Plutocracy IV: Gangsters for Capitalism, Includes interviews with Rachleff
Macalester Publications

Living people
Year of birth missing (living people)
21st-century American historians
21st-century American male writers
Macalester College faculty
Amherst College alumni
University of Pittsburgh alumni
American male non-fiction writers